Monte Barrett (born May 26, 1971) is an American former professional boxer who competed from 1996 to 2014. He challenged once for the WBA heavyweight title in 2006, and fought many top heavyweight champions and contenders during his career.

Amateur career
Barrett had 40 amateur fights, finishing his amateur career with 37-3 record, signed a contract with Joe De Guardia and turned pro in 1996.

Professional career
As a professional, Barrett had 21 consecutive wins before losing against Lance Whitaker on August 28, 1998. He won a heavyweight title (albeit a regional one) later. Barrett fought Phil Jackson for the vacant WBC Continental Americas Heavyweight title on April 3, 1999. On July 15, 2000, Barrett rose 5 times against future International Boxing Federation heavyweight champion Wladimir Klitschko, but ultimately was knocked out after 3 knockdowns in the 7th round. He also fought contender Joe Mesi in a fight that saw both fighters go down but one in which, ultimately, Mesi prevailed by ten round majority decision. Barrett defeated prospects Dominick Guinn and Owen Beck, the latter in an elimination bout for a shot at either the IBF title (then held by Chris Byrd) or the WBC title (then held by Vitali Klitschko). After Klitschko injured his back, Barrett fought Hasim Rahman for the WBC interim title and lost by unanimous decision after 12 rounds.

Despite his loss, he fought World Boxing Association heavyweight champion Nikolay Valuev in October at Rosemont, Illinois. Barrett lost via technical knockout in the 11th round. Barrett was knocked down in the eighth and eleventh rounds, but managed to get up. After being knocked down for the second time in the eleventh round, his trainer, James Ali Basheer, jumped into the ring to stop the fight.

Barrett was beaten in the second round in a July 2007 bout against Cliff Couser. Barrett avenged this loss in a December 2007 rematch in which he stopped Couser in the second round. After knocking out Damon Reed, Barrett knocked out Tye Fields in the first round on June 28, 2008, his last win.

Barrett lost to former cruiserweight champion David Haye (who was also the promoter of the fight) on November 15, 2008, at the O2 arena in London, by knockout at 1:28 fifth round,  after being put down five times in the fight. Haye then beat Nicolai Valuev, who had beaten Monte by an eleventh round stoppage in October 2006, to win the WBA's share of the world heavyweight title.

Monte fought Odlanier Solís on October 10, 2009, but lost by second round technical knockout. He then fought Alexander Ustinov on December 12, 2009 but lost a unanimous decision after 12 rounds.

On July 17, 2010 Barrett drew against David Tua in his final fight. Tua dominated the early rounds through aggression, but Barrett took control in the later rounds and scored a knockdown in the 12th (knocking down Tua for the first time in his professional career). The bout resulted in a controversial draw (as a point was also deducted from Tua in round 12 for throwing Barrett to the canvas) with two judges scoring the fight 113–113 and the third a 115–111 result to Tua. On August 7, 2010, appearing ringside at a fight card at Aviator Arena in Brooklyn, New York, in a brief interview, Barrett confirmed his retirement from the ring and his intention to take a job offered to him in private industry. On August 21, 2010, Barrett entered the ring at The Prudential Center in Newark after IBF International heavyweight champion Tomas Adamek won a decision over Michael Grant. Seeking to come out of retirement, Barrett congratulated and challenged Adamek to a 12 round bout. However, after fighting to an eight round draw in Virginia with Charles Davis in January 2011, Barrett began training for a rematch with David Tua which was held in New Zealand. On August 13, 2011, Barrett defeated Tua via unanimous decision and won the WBO Asia Pacific and WBO Oriental Heavyweight titles. In December 2011, it emerged Monte Barrett tested positive for banned stimulant methylhex-anemine following a urine test after his August 13 points decision over the Kiwi-Samoan boxer. Blair Edwards Tua'a lawyer, called for action against the 40-year-old New Yorker requesting the return of Tua's WBO Asia-Pacific and Oriental titles and restoration of ranking points.

Barrett fought New Zealander Shane Cameron on July 5, 2012 with the winner becoming the number one contender to fight NZPBA title holder Sonny Bill Williams. Days before the fight he admitted the Shane Cameron fight would be "a challenge", but that was spurring him on to win. Barrett also stated that he would look for a third fight with David Tua, after he had beaten Cameron. However he was knocked out in the 4th round with a right hand and lost the titles that he had won against David Tua the previous year.

Professional boxing record

References

External links

 BoxingRecords

1971 births
Living people
Sportspeople from Greenville, North Carolina
African-American boxers
Boxers from North Carolina
Heavyweight boxers
American male boxers
21st-century African-American sportspeople
20th-century African-American sportspeople